Edwin Harris Ragsdale (December 18, 1929 – September 13, 2017) was an American real estate developer and Republican politician from Virginia. After serving as Chairman of the Henrico County Board of Supervisors, he was elected to two terms in the Virginia House of Delegates, serving from 1972 to 1976. He ran again in 1982, defeating Delegate George W. Grayson but was bested in a rematch the next year.

References

External links
 

1929 births
2017 deaths
Republican Party members of the Virginia House of Delegates
20th-century American politicians
People from Dinwiddie County, Virginia